The 1973 World Table Tennis Championships men's singles was the 32nd edition of the men's singles championship. 

Hsi En-ting defeated Kjell Johansson in the final, winning three sets to two to secure the title.

Results

See also
List of World Table Tennis Championships medalists

References

-